The  is a front-engine, five passenger, mid-size passenger car manufactured and marketed by Nissan Motors over three generations. Almost all Cefiro's were marketed as four-door sedans, though a five-door wagon body style was briefly available (1997–2000). In most cases, the Cefiro used Nissan's VQ six-cylinder engines, named Ward's 10 Best Engines more than ten years running.

Nissan marketed the Cefiro in the Japanese Domestic Market (JDM) as well as worldwide, the latter under numerous badge-engineered nameplates, including as the Nissan Maxima (North America, Australia), Samsung SM5 (Korea), Infiniti I30 and Infiniti I35 (North America) and Maxima QX (Europe, Russia). Models manufactured under license were marketed in Indonesia, Kuala Lumpur and Taiwan.

The first generation Cefiro (internally designated the A31, 1988-1994), used rear-wheel drive; offered four- and six-cylinder engines; and became popular in motorsport drifting. The second generation (A32, 1995-1998) and third generation (A33, 1995-2004) used exclusively a front-wheel drive and V6 engine drivetrain. After the A31, A32 and A33 generations, Nissan would also later use the Cefiro nameplate on examples of its first generation Teana (J31) sedan — exported to Asian and Latin American markets.

Nissan began using the Cefiro nameplate - derived from the Spanish word céfiro,  meaning zephyr - in 1988; the nameplate was officially retired in 2012.



First generation (A31, 1988-1993) 

Nissan released the A31 series Cefiro sedan to Japan in September 1988, sharing its transmission, engine and rear suspension setup with the R32 Skyline, F31 Leopard, and C33 Laurel — with the exception of the diesel engine, which was available only in the Laurel. The platform and front suspension (strut type) were shared with the Laurel with the exception of the 4WD Cefiro, which used the Skyline GTS4's multiple-link front suspension and front drive train. The chassis was shared with the Laurel only, as it had a slightly longer wheelbase than the Skyline chassis.

The Cefiro rivaled the Toyota Cresta and Toyota Chaser triplets, with Nissan offering the Cefiro as a comparable fourth alternative to the Skyline and Laurel models, selling each vehicle at a separate Nissan dealership (Nissan Prince for the Skyline, Nissan Motor for the Laurel, Nissan Bluebird for the Leopard, and Nissan Satio for the Cefiro). The model code "A31" was chosen as the number combination "A30" was previously used by the 1967–1971 Nissan Gloria soon after Nissan had merged with the Prince Motor Company. The Cefiro took the top-level position at Nissan Satio as its exterior dimensions were exactly the same as the luxury sedans Nissan Cedric (exclusive to Nissan Bluebird) and the Nissan Gloria (exclusive to Nissan Prince) locations.

Brand new, the Cefiro was slightly more expensive than the equivalent Nissan Skyline and offered the first time projector beam headlights, automatic tinting rear vision cabin mirror, electrically adjustable seats, automatic headlights, steering wheel mounted radio controls, HICAS four-wheel steering, electronically adjustable (damper) suspension and Nissans proprietary 4WD system, ATTESA E-TS. Its equipment and features helped justify the moderately high annual road tax bill to Japanese buyers, although the exterior dimensions and engine displacement (on models equipped with 2.0L engines) remained within "compact" class size regulations, keeping demand high.

Nissan took the unusual step of marketing a left-hand drive version of the Cefiro A31 in Latin America, Turkey, and other Eurasian countries as the Nissan Laurel Altima – in most export markets this slot was filled by the Nissan Maxima. Unlike the Japanese versions, export models are fitted with a carburetted single cam CA20S inline-four producing  and RB24 engine which was a single-cam 2.4-liter RB inline-six producing . Left hand drive Laurel Altimas were the flagship vehicle of Nissan's Turkish lineup for the early 1990s.

From 1990, Nissan facelifted the A31 with revised tail lights, center console, grill and cabin fabrics. Also available from 1990 were "SE" models, featuring revised tail light, silver grill, revised bumpers, center console and updated interior.

Second generation (A32, 1994-1997)

Nissan debuted the A32 series Cefiro to the JDM in August 1994. Generally, the A32 was only badged as the Cefiro for the JDM; exported A32s often carried the Maxima badge. In Europe, the A32 was marketed as the "Nissan Maxima QX". The 2- and 3-liter engines were offered in export markets, while the mid-range 2.5 was only available in the Japanese Domestic Market. The Cefiro received a very light facelift in January 1997, including new multi-reflector head- and taillights. Sportier models received black backing in the headlamps, while more comfort-oriented versions were chromed. There were also minor changes to the interior and the trim around the door frames, while ABS and airbags became standard across the range in the home market.

The character of the A32 changed with its new front-wheel drive configuration with Nissan's VQ six-cylinder engines. Four-wheel drive was not available on this and the next generation. The JDM Cefiro was also offered as a wagon beginning in June 1997, as an alternative to the Toyota Mark II Qualis. The Cefiro Wagon (WA32) continued to be produced after the sedan's discontinuation, only being eliminated in August 2000.

In Taiwan, the Cefiro A32 was manufactured by Yulon under the Nissan brand. Other countries that adopted the Cefiro name included most Southeast Asian countries (example Malaysia, Singapore and Thailand). In South Korea, it was badge engineered and introduced as the Renault Samsung SM5.

In the Philippines, the Cefiro A32 replaced the A31 Cefiro in 1997. It is powered by Nissan's 2.0L VQ20DE V6 engine paired to a 4-speed automatic transmission.

In 2000, Nissan introduced an all-new trim "Brougham VIP". The "Brougham VIP" is powered by the same 2.0L V6 engine mated to a 4-speed automatic transmission. It featured a redesigned grill, headlight & taillight.

By 2002, a new trim "Elite" was added alongside the "Brougham VIP" trim. Both trims are still powered by Nissan's 2.0L V6 engine mated to a 4-speed automatic transmission respectively. The new "Elite" trim featured power adjustable seats, faux wood trim, full leather interior with tufted seats, a re-designed 6 speaker audio system with 6 CD/VCD changer.The "Brougham VIP" trim received different wheel designs, a unique pagcor emblem, automatic climate control, and a power moon roof.

By 2004, Nissan introduced another new trim called "300EX". The "300EX" is now powered by Nissan's 3.0L VQ30DE V6 engine paired to a standard automatic transmission with sport mode. It featured different wheel designs, leather interior & seats, keyless entry, rear armrests, rear aircon vents, factory fitted alarm, immobiliser, power rear winshield sunvisor, among other features.

Infiniti I30 

Infiniti launched the Cefiro in North America as the Infiniti I30 for model year 1996, manufactured at Oppama, Japan (where the Maxima was built), commencing June 27, 1995. The new I30 replaced the Infiniti J30. To reduce ambiguity in the nameplate, the rear I30 emblem used two fonts: a cursive letter "I" combined with a serif font for the "30", eliminating the possibility the emblem would be read as 130".

As Infiniti's top seller at the time, the I30 was the brand's mid-level model, joining the entry-level Primera-based Infiniti G20 until the introduction of the Skyline-based Infiniti G35 to North America for model year 2003. The Infiniti I30 was also marketed in South Korea and Indonesia. In January 1997, the Cefiro "Brown Selection" was added to the lineup in Japan, equipped with the I30's chromed front grille and a brown interior.

The I30 shared the 3.0-liter VQ30DE V6 engine producing  with the North American Maxima. Revisions to the I30 over the generation included revised tail-lights and trunk garnish. The Touring model, I30t, gained five-spoke alloy wheels, more firm suspension tuning as well as a spoiler and BBS wheels. A small number of first-generation I30s had five-speed manual transmissions, many with VLSD. An in-dash hands-free car phone was available as an option.

 Gallery 

  Third generation (A33, 1998-2004) 

Nissan released its A33 series in December 1998 initially as the JDM Cefiro, subsequently marketing badge engineered variants worldwide — prominently under its North American Infiniti brand as the I30 and I35.

For the Japanese Domestic Market (JDM), Nissan offered the A33 in 2.0 and 2.5 Excimo, 2.0 and 2.5 Excimo G, 2.0 and 2.5 S Touring, and 3.0 Brougham VIP trim levels. A five-speed manual transmission was offered for the 2.0 Excimo and 2.0 S Touring. The limited edition "L Selection" and modified Autech version were also offered in Japan. In January 2001 the Cefiro received a facelift, incorporating the larger bumpers used on export models and the Infiniti I30.

Worldwide
In Australia, Nissan marketed the A33 as the Maxima from 1999 through to 2003. Trim levels were S, ST, and Ti—all powered by the 3.0-liter engine. In Europe, Nissan continued to market the A33 as the Nissan Maxima QX with the 2.0 and 3.0 V6 engines, producing  respectively. In most Southeast Asian countries, the A33 was manufactured until 2008 as the 3.0 Brougham VIP and Excimo 2.0 G under license by Edaran Tan Chong Motor Sdn Bhd in Kuala Lumpur, Malaysia. In Taiwan, the A33  version was manufactured by Yulon and marketed as the Cefiro, the last Nissan Cefiro manufactured by Yulon. In Iran, Pars Khodro manufactured the A33 under license from 2002 to 2012, under the Maxima nameplate. In Indonesia, versions were marketed from 2000 to 2002 as the Infiniti I30 Standard and Touring. Later models from 2002 to 2003 was marketed as Nissan Cefiro 3.0 Brougham VIP.

North America

 Infiniti I30 (A33, 1998-2001) 

Infiniti based the MY 2000 I30 on the A33 Cefiro. Compared to the similar Nissan Maxima, the I30 included a more powerful engine with a variable capacity muffler and an additional fenderwell air intake, different front and rear body styling, gauge cluster design, a foot-pedal parking brake (as compared to the Maxima's center console mounted lever), center dashboard design, the availability of a rear sunshade, and standard drivers seat memory. The I30t ("touring"), equipped included High-Intensity Discharge (HID) xenon headlamps with darker colored headlamp surrounds, a viscous limited-slip differential, larger 17" wheels, and the availability of a Sport Package which consisted of a rear decklid-mounted spoiler and side-sill body extensions. The rear spoiler was offered as a dealer accessory on the non-Touring I30.

 Gallery 

Infiniti I35 (A33, 2002-2004)

Nissan updated the I30 for model year 2002 as the I35 (A33) for its Infiniti luxury division, launching the model with an estimated $40 million advertising campaign beginning in September 2001. Sales began on September 12, 2001 at 150 retailers across the United States, continuing its role as a badge engineered Cefiro positioned above another Cefiro variant, the North American Maxima (A33B).

The I35 nameplate reflected the new engine, a 3.5 liter VQ35DE V6, producing  and teamed with a four-speed automatic transmission. Other revisions from its predecessor included the painted (rather than chromed) door handles, horizontal front grill, high-intensity xenon headlights, standard fog lights, revised trunk lid, combination lamps, larger badging, and low-restriction exhaust with chrome finishers. With the I35, standard tires increased from 16" to 17", and the turning radius increased from 35.4 to 40.0 feet.

The exterior and interior were designed at the Nissan Technical Center (NTC) in Atsugi, Japan. The I35 featured a coefficient of drag of .31 (.30 where equipped with a rear spoiler), an interior passenger volume of 120 cubic feet, and a 62/38 front/rear weight bias. Manufacture continued at Nissan's Oppama Plant.

Mechanical
The modular VQ engine design featured continuous valve timing control, variable induction system, silent timing chain, electronically controlled throttle, micro-finished crank journals and cam lobes, molybdenum coated lightweight pistons, resin intake collector, digital knock control, six individual coils (one per spark plug), cross-flow coolant pattern, electronically controlled fluid mounts and double platinum-tipped spark plugs.

The I35 featured strut and coil spring front suspension, a torsion (twist) beam rear suspension with a Scott Russell linkage marketed as Multi-Link Beam, front and rear stabilizer bars, and speed-sensitive power rack-and-pinion steering. The Sport option included a system marketed as Vehicle Dynamic Control (VDC) which made engine changes and deployed a brake to inhibit sliding behavior. Specifications included 4-wheel anti-lock brakes, electronic brake force distribution, brake assist, 4-speed electronically controlled automatic transmission; and an electronic traction control system, and engine-speed-sensitive power-assisted rack-and-pinion steering, now with a 40' turning radius.

Equipment
Interior features included leather-appointed seats (marketed as Sojourner premium leather, at least in one instance reportedly developed in Florence, Italy) with seatback embroidered Infiniti logo (2003-2004); simulated birdseye maple accents on the center console (expanded to include vertical ashtray and surround 2003-2004) and leather-wrapped tilt steering wheel, eight-way power-adjustable driver seat with manual lumbar support; driver's seat automatic entry/exit system that moves the seat fore/aft on entry/exit; 14.9 cubic feet trunk capacity; trunk-mounted first aid kit and emergency inside trunk-release; temporary spare tire; automatic temperature control system, driver's two position seat memory with entry/exit assist system, analog clock, HVAC microfilter ventilation system with reusable, washable filter, titanium-color accented gated shifter with simulated birdseye maple gearshift knob, front seatback pockets, electro-luminescent instrument cluster with multi-function trip computer, universal transceiver with rolling code feature, cruise control with steering wheel-mounted controls, automatic anti-glare rear view mirror with compass; stainless steel sill plates and an optional navigation system with dash-mounted power flip-up monitor.

Standard equipment also included a Bose 200-watt, 7-speaker premium audio system with AM/FM in-dash 6-disc CD changer, steering wheel audio controls, speed-sensitive volume control, radio RDS function and dual in-glass diversity antennas; power-operated rear sunshade, 8-way power driver's seat and 4-way power passenger's seat; High Intensity Discharge (HID) xenon headlights, body-color outside door handles; electromagnetic trunk and fuel door release, remote keyless entry with fob-operated front window auto-down and key operated up/down; retained accessory power; automatic anti-glare rearview mirror with integrated digital compass, and lockable split- folding rear seats.

Options groups included the Sunroof and Sunshade Package with moonroof (with variable control switch in place of a rocker-type switch) and rear power sunshade (optional 2002-2003, standard equipment 2004); Cold Weather Package with heated front (and rear, Canada) seats, leather-wrapped heated steering wheel (with deleted simulated maple accents) and heated outside mirrors with timer; and Sport package with 8-spoke champagne-tinted 17-inch aluminum-alloy wheels and P225/50R17 V-rated tires, Vehicle Dynamic Control, sport-tuned suspension and side sill extensions. Canadian I35 content varied, including as standard equipment a heated steering wheel and heated rear seats.

Individual options included 8-spoke chrome-finished 17-inch aluminum-alloy wheels; navigation system with power-retractable color LCD screen, trunk-mounted 6-disc CD autochanger; side sill extensions:  side rocker sill moldings, rear spoiler and a full-size spare tire with aluminum-alloy wheel (reducing available cargo room).

Exterior colors included Brilliant Silver (silver, 2002-2004), Ivory Pearl (white, 2002-2004), Golden Sand (light gold, 2002-2004), Black Obsidian (black, 2002-2004), Midnight Blue (dark metallic blue, 2002-2004), Millennium Jade (light metallic green, 2002-2003), Royal Ruby (dark maroon, 2002), Autumn Bronze (brown, 2002-2004), Diamond Graphite (dark gray metallic, 2003-2004), Desert Platinum metallic (medium gold, 2004). Interior "Sojourner" leather was available three color themes: marketed as Willow [gray], Graphite [black] and Beige [beige].

Advertising
The I35 was introduced with an ad campaign featuring print, radio, newspaper, direct mail, internet ads as well as a television commercial by TBWA\Chiat\Day titled Hummingbird.'' The ad depicted an I35 driving in the background along a country road with a hummingbird in the foreground. The car and hummingbird moved at full speed, the bird's wings blurred.  The action then slowed, the voice of actress Natasha Richardson advised the viewer 'not to blink' — and the action returned to full-speed.  The ad closed with the tagline, "More Power, More Grace, More I... the new I35, from Infiniti."

Later use of the Cefiro nameplate (J31, 2003) 

Nissan discontinued the Cefiro in 2003, later using the nameplate on the Nissan Teana (J31), exported to Hong Kong, Nepal, Bangladesh, Singapore, Brunei, Latin America and the Caribbean. Ghandhara Nissan in Karachi, Pakistan, was the last plant using the Cefiro name when it was replaced by the Nissan Teana J32 in late 2012.

References 

Cefiro
All-wheel-drive vehicles
Cars introduced in 1988
Mid-size cars
Vehicles with four-wheel steering
1990s cars
2000s cars
Cars discontinued in 2008